Parma City School District is a school district that serves Parma, Parma Heights, and Seven Hills. The district is in the southwestern section of Cuyahoga County, Ohio. The District's sports stadium is Byers Field. All three high schools play golf at Ridgewood for their homecourse.

Schools

High schools
Since 2012, they've been serving 8th-12th graders.

Normandy High School
Parma Senior High School will close at the end of the 2022-23 school year
Valley Forge High School

Middle schools
Since 2012, they've been serving 5th-7th graders.

Greenbriar Middle School
Hillside Middle School
Shiloh Middle School

Elementary schools
Since 2012, they've been serving K-4th graders.

Dentzler Elementary School
Green Valley Elementary School
John Muir Elementary School
Parma Park Elementary School will close at the end of the 2022-23 school year
Pleasant Valley Elementary School
Renwood Elementary School will close at the end of the 2022-23 school year
Ridge-Brook Elementary School
Thoreau Park Elementary School

See also
 Winkelman v. Parma City School District

External links
http://www.parmacityschools.org/

School districts in Cuyahoga County, Ohio